The 1996–97 NBA season was the 27th season of the National Basketball Association in Cleveland, Ohio. The Cavaliers selected big men, Ukrainian center Vitaly Potapenko with the 12th pick, and Lithuanian center Zydrunas Ilgauskas with the 20th pick in the 1996 NBA draft. However, Ilgauskas would miss the entire season with a broken bone in his right foot. During the off-season, the team signed free agent Mark West. The Cavaliers started their season winning nine of their first twelve games, but after a 21–10 start, they lost six straight games in January while losing 11 of their next 14 games. The team played above .500 for the entire season, holding a 25–22 record at the All-Star break, but started to struggle down the stretch, losing 10 of their 16 games in March. On the final day of the regular season on April 20, 1997, the Cavaliers faced the Washington Bullets at the Gund Arena, as both teams were fighting for the eighth and final playoff spot in the Eastern Conference. The Bullets won 85–81 as the Cavs missed the playoffs, finishing 5th in the Central Division with a 42–40 record. The Cavaliers had the fifth best team defensive rating in the NBA.

Terrell Brandon led the team with 19.5 points, 6.3 assists and 1.8 steals per game, and was selected for the 1997 NBA All-Star Game, which Cleveland hosted. In addition, Chris Mills averaged 13.4 points and 6.2 rebounds per game, while Tyrone Hill provided the team with 12.9 points, 9.9 rebounds per game and shot .600 in field-goal percentage, and Bobby Phills contributed 12.6 points and 1.6 steals per game. Danny Ferry provided with 10.6 points per game, while off the bench, second-year guard Bob Sura contributed 9.2 points and 4.8 assists per game, and Potapenko averaged 5.8 points and 2.7 rebounds per game.

Following the season, Brandon and Hill were both traded to the Milwaukee Bucks in an off-season three-team trade, while Mills signed as a free agent with the Boston Celtics, who then traded him to the New York Knicks two months later, Phills signed with the Charlotte Hornets, and West signed with the Indiana Pacers.

Offseason

Free agents

Trades

Draft picks

*1st round pick acquired from Washington in Mark Price deal. **2nd round pick acquired from Orlando in Steve Kerr deal.
 2nd round pick (#50) traded to Houston in Keith Hughes deal. Used to draft Terrell Bell.

Roster

Roster Notes
 Rookie center Zydrunas Ilgauskas missed the entire season due to a broken bone in his right foot.

Regular season

Season standings

Record vs. opponents

Game log

|- align="center" bgcolor=
|-
|| || || || || ||
|-

|- align="center" bgcolor=
|-
|| || || || || ||
|-

|- align="center" bgcolor=
|-
|| || || || || ||
|-

|- align="center" bgcolor=
|-
|| || || || || ||
|-

|- align="center" bgcolor=
|-
|| || || || || ||
|-

|- align="center" bgcolor=
|-
|| || || || || ||
|-

Player stats

Regular season

Player Statistics Citation:

Awards and records

Awards

Records

Milestones

All-Star 
Terrell Brandon - 1997 NBA All-Star Game

Transactions

Trades

Free agents

Development League

References

External links
 Cleveland Cavaliers on Database Basketball
 Cleveland Cavaliers on Basketball Reference

Cleveland Cavaliers seasons
Cleve
Cleve